Anaerostipes is a Gram positive and anaerobic bacterial genus from the family of Lachnospiraceae. Anaerostipes occurs in the human gut. Anaerostipes may protect against colon cancer in humans by producing butyric acid.

References

Further reading 
 
 
 

Lachnospiraceae
Bacteria genera